Leadbelly is a 1976 film chronicling the life of folk singer Huddie Ledbetter (better known as "Lead Belly"). The film was directed by Gordon Parks, and starred Roger E. Mosley in the title role.  The film focuses on the troubles of Lead Belly's youth in the segregated South including his time in prison, and his efforts to use his music to gain release.

Plot
Huddie Ledbetter leaves his father's house just barely into his twenties and arrives at a brothel on Fannin' Street run by Miss Eula, who nicknames him Leadbelly and has him play at the bar. For a while, she takes care of him until the police arrive, breaking up a party. Leadbelly and an old man escape via a train and Leadbelly buys a twelve-string acoustic guitar from the old man. Seeking work, he takes a job picking cotton. He soon leaves on a train to Silver City where he meets Blind Lemon and they start playing shows together.

At one show, a drunken man tells Leadbelly to keep playing, and threatens him. Leadbelly responds by smashing his guitar onto him and is arrested. He escapes from jail and leads a normal life until he and two other men are on their way home after a night of drinking. One of the men mentions that the other man's woman had sex with Lead Belly during the evening. The man pulls out a gun to shoot Lead Belly but Lead Belly also pulls out his gun and is able to shoot the other man first, killing him. He is thrown in prison where he is forced to work in a chain gang. When he tries to escape, he is caught and put in a box. His father arrives and tries to bail Leadbelly out, but fails. Before leaving, he manages to convince the warden to get Leadbelly a twelve-string acoustic guitar.

After getting the new guitar, he plays a song for Governor Pat Neff who reassures Leadbelly he will be set free. After he leaves prison, he returns to Fannin Street, sees it has lost its former glory, and he is reunited with Miss Eula. He returns to his father's home only to find that a new family lives there. A group of men attack Leadbelly and slash his throat. Leadbelly happens to stab and kill a man in self-defense but is thrown back in prison. John and Alan Lomax visit the prison and interview Leadbelly, having him play all his songs for them. After he finishes telling his life story, they tell him they will see what they can do about getting him out of prison. The film ends with a title card stating that Leadbelly was released from prison and pursued his music career.

Cast
 Roger E. Mosley as Huddie "Lead Belly" Ledbetter/Walter Boyd
 Paul Benjamin as Wes Ledbetter
 Madge Sinclair as Miss Eula
 Alan Manson as Prison Chief Guard
 Albert Hall as Dicklicker
 Art Evans as Lemon "Blind Lemon" Jefferson
 James Brodhead as John Lomax
 John Henry Faulk as Governor Pat Neff
 Vivian Bonnell as Old Lady
 Dana Manno as Margaret Judd
 Lynn Hamilton as Sally Ledbetter
 William Wintersole as Sheriff

Further reading
 Kevles, Barbara. "The Marketing of Leadbelly." Cineaste Fall 2003: 34-35.
 Boyd, III, L. Roi. "Exploring Gordon Parks' "Leadbelly": Thirty Years Later"
 BTNews Vol.16, No.1 Winter/Spring 2006: 15-20.

References

External links
 
 
 

1976 films
1970s biographical drama films
American biographical drama films
Biographical films about musicians
Biographical films about singers
Blues films
Films directed by Gordon Parks
Films scored by Fred Karlin
Films set in Louisiana
Films set in Texas
Films set in the 1910s
Films set in the 1920s
Films set in the 1930s
Films shot in Texas
Marlin, Texas
Paramount Pictures films
Cultural depictions of blues musicians
1976 drama films
1970s English-language films
1970s American films